The 1984 East Texas State Lions football team represented East Texas State University—now known as Texas A&M University–Commerce—as a member of the Lone Star Conference (LSC) during the 1984 NCAA Division II football season. Led by 21st-year head coach Ernest Hawkins, the Lions compiled an overall record of 5–5 with a mark of 1–3 in conference play, placing fourth in the LSC. East Texas State played home games at Memorial Stadium in Commerce, Texas.

Schedule

Postseason awards

All-Americans
Alan Veingrad, First Team Offensive Tackle 
Donnie White, Second Team Linebacker

All-Lone Star Conference

LSC First Team
Javier Cardenas, Tight End 
Bubba Elmore, Defensive Back 
Wes Smith, Receiver 
Alan Veingrad, Offensive Tackle 
Donnie White, Linebacker 
Curtis Williams, Center

LSC Second Team
Bruno Briones, Quarterback 
Mark Copeland, Linebacker  
Ricky Dirks, Tailback

LSC Honorable Mention
Stan Haggerty, Fullback 
Larry Hamilton, Defensive Line 
Ralph Oberdieck, Offensive Tackle 
Mark Spencer, WR

References

East Texas State
Texas A&M–Commerce Lions football seasons
East Texas State Lions football